Double Up is the second studio album by Harlem rapper Mase, released in 1999 and distributed by Bad Boy Records. The album sold 350,000 copies in its first week, debuting at #1 and was certified Gold by the RIAA exactly one month after its release on July 15, 1999. Shortly after the release, Mase briefly retired from rapping to become a Christian pastor.

Critical reception

Track listing

Samples
"All I Ever Wanted" contains a sample of "San Francisco Bay" by Lee Oskar.
"Same Niggas" contains lyrics from "The Way It Is" by Bruce Hornsby & The Range.
"No Matter What" contains a sample of "Cars" by Gary Numan.

Charts

Weekly charts

Year-end charts

Certifications

References

  

Mase albums
1999 albums
Bad Boy Records albums